Luigi Moretti (born 7 February 1949) is an Italian Catholic archbishop. He was the Archbishop of Salerno-Campagna-Acerno from 2010 to 2019.

Biography 
Luigi Moretti was born on 7 February 1949 in the comune of Cittareale in the region of Lazio, Italy.

Priestly ministry 
In 1960, Moretti entered the Pontifical Roman Minor Seminary from which he graduated in 1968. He was ordained a priest at the Pontifical Roman Major Seminary on 30 November 1974 by Cardinal Ugo Poletti.

He then received a bachelor's degree in philosophy from the Pontifical Lateran University and a licentiate in moral theology from the Alphonsian Academy.

From 1974 to 1978, he was Assistant to the Pontifical Roman Major Seminary. From 1976 to 1980, he taught moral theology at the St. Bonaventure Theological Faculty at the Regina Mundi Institute. Between 1978 and 1983, he was parochial vicar in the Parish of St. Lucia.

Episcopal ministry 

On 3 July 1998, Pope John Paul II appointed Moretti Titular Bishop of Mopta, granting him the position of prelate secretary of the Vicariate of Rome and appointing him an auxiliary bishop of Rome for the central sector of the diocese.

He was consecrated a bishop in the Papal Archbasilica of St. John Lateran on 12 September 1998 by Cardinal Camillo Ruini.

From 17 October 2003, he held the position of Vicegerent of Rome and in 2004, he assumed the role of auxiliary bishop for the eastern sector of the diocese.

Moretti also held the position of ecclesiastical assistant to Pius Sodalizio dei Piceni, was a member of the committee for the foundation of religion and worship of called Istituto Guido and Bice Schillaci Ventura, was on the council for economic affairs of the Diocese of Rome, was the episcopal president of the family and life commission of the Lazio Episcopal Conference, was a member of the family and life commission of the Italian Episcopal Conference, and was the national ecclesiastical assistant to UNITALSI.

On 10 June 2010, he was appointed Archbishop of Salerno-Campagna-Acerno. Additionally, he took the title ex officio of Primate of the Kingdom of Naples.

References

External links 

 Archdiocese of Salerno-Campagna-Acerno
 Diocese of Rome

Living people
21st-century Italian Roman Catholic archbishops
20th-century Italian Roman Catholic bishops
Archbishops of Salerno
1949 births
People from the Province of Rieti
Bishops appointed by Pope John Paul II
Pontifical Lateran University alumni
Pontifical Roman Seminary alumni